San Pedro Puxtla is a municipality in the Ahuachapán department of El Salvador. 

Municipalities of the Ahuachapán Department